|}

The Royal Bond Novice Hurdle is a Grade 1 National Hunt hurdle race in Ireland which is open to horses aged four years or older. It is run at Fairyhouse over a distance of about 2 miles (3,219 metres), and during its running there are ten hurdles to be jumped. The race is for novice hurdlers, and it is scheduled to take place each year in late November or early December.

The event is named after Royal Bond, a successful National Hunt horse trained by Arthur Moore in the early 1980s. It was established in 1994, and it has held Grade 1 status throughout its history. It is usually staged on the same afternoon as two other top-grade races – the Drinmore Novice Chase and the Hatton's Grace Hurdle.

Records
Leading jockey (4 wins):
 Paul Carberry – Gambolling Doc (1994), Wild Passion (2004), Iktitaf (2005), Muirhead (2007)
 Charlie Swan – Thats My Man (1995), Istabraq (1996), Liss A Paoraigh (2000), Like-a-Butterfly (2001)
 Ruby Walsh - Alexander Banquet (1998), Sous les Cieux (2011), Long Dog (2015), Quick Grabim (2018)

Leading trainer (9 wins):
 Willie Mullins - Alexander Banquet (1998), Hurricane Fly (2008), Zaidpour (2010), Sous les Cieux (2011), Nichols Canyon (2014), Long Dog (2015), Airlie Beach (2016), Quick Grabim (2018), Statuaire (2021)

Winners

See also
 Horse racing in Ireland
 List of Irish National Hunt races

References
 Racing Post:
 pedigreequery.com – Royal Bond Novice Hurdle – Fairyhouse.

National Hunt races in Ireland
National Hunt hurdle races
Recurring sporting events established in 1994
Fairyhouse Racecourse
1994 establishments in Ireland